Jan Louise Murray Wade (née Noone; born 8 July 1937) is a former Australian politician.

She was born in Sydney to John Murray Noone and Lillian, née Knight. She attended Sydney High School and Firbank Girls' Grammar School in Melbourne, and graduated from the University of Melbourne in 1959 with a Bachelor of Law. She later attained a Bachelor of Arts in 1979.

She married Francis Bannatyne Lewis, with whom she had four children. From 1960 to 1961 she worked in London as a schoolteacher before returning to Australia as a law tutor at the University of Melbourne from 1963 to 1964. A solicitor from 1964 to 1967, she joined the Parliamentary Counsel's office in 1967, becoming Assistant Chief Parliamentary Counsel in 1978. Also in 1978, she married Peter Brian Wade, and, in so doing, acquired a step-daughter. In 1979, she was appointed Commissioner for Corporate Affairs and, in 1985, President of the Equal Opportunity Board.

In 1988, she successfully contested a by-election in the Victorian Legislative Assembly seat of Kew, for the Liberal Party. After her election she was appointed Shadow Attorney-General. She moved to Women's Affairs in 1989 but resumed her previous role in 1990. Following the Coalition victory at the 1992 state election she became Attorney-General, Minister for Fair Trading, and Minister for Women's Affairs.

She retired from politics in 1999, after which she was a visiting professor at Victoria University and a writer of an occasional column in the Australian Financial Review.

References

1937 births
Living people
Liberal Party of Australia members of the Parliament of Victoria
Members of the Victorian Legislative Assembly
Victorian Ministers for Women
Attorneys-General of Victoria
Women members of the Victorian Legislative Assembly
University of Melbourne alumni
Academic staff of the University of Melbourne
University of Melbourne women
Academic staff of the Victoria University, Melbourne
Australian solicitors
People educated at Sydney Girls High School
People educated at Firbank Girls' Grammar School
Politicians from Sydney